Austrophlebia subcostalis is a species of dragonfly of the family Telephlebiidae,
commonly known as the northern giant darner. 
It is an enormous dragonfly with brown and yellow markings.
It inhabits rainforest streams in north-eastern Australia

Gallery

See also
 List of Odonata species of Australia

References

Telephlebiidae
Odonata of Australia
Insects of Australia
Endemic fauna of Australia
Taxa named by Günther Theischinger
Insects described in 1996